Vallentin is a surname. Notable people with the surname include:

Elinor Frances Vallentin (1873–1924), British botanist and botanical illustrator active in the Falkland Islands
Hermann Vallentin (1872–1945), German actor
John Franks Vallentin (1882–1914), British military officer